Vulnerability refers to "the quality or state of being exposed to the possibility of being attacked or harmed, either physically or emotionally."

A window of vulnerability (WOV) is a time frame within which defensive measures are diminished, compromised, or lacking.

The understanding of social and environmental vulnerability, as a methodological approach, involves the analysis of the risks and assets of disadvantaged groups, such as the elderly. The approach of vulnerability in itself brings great expectations of social policy and gerontological planning. Types of vulnerability include social, cognitive, environmental, emotional or military.

In relation to hazards and disasters, vulnerability is a concept that links the relationship that people have with their environment to social forces and institutions and the cultural values that sustain and contest them. “The concept of vulnerability expresses the multi-dimensionality of disasters by focusing attention on the totality of relationships in a given social situation which constitute a condition that, in combination with environmental forces, produces a disaster”. It is also the extent to which changes could harm a system, or to which the community can be affected by the impact of a hazard or exposed to the possibility of being attacked or harmed, either physically or emotionally.

Within the body of literature related to vulnerability, one major research stream includes the methodology behind said research, namely measuring and assessing indicators of vulnerability. These include external—sudden shocks and continued stresses—and internal indicators, such as defenselessness or inability to cope with incapacities. Vulnerability research covers a complex, multidisciplinary field including development and poverty studies, public health, climate studies,  studies, engineering, geography, political ecology, and disaster risk management. This research is of importance and interest for organizations trying to reduce vulnerability – especially as related to poverty and other Millennium Development Goals. Many institutions are conducting interdisciplinary research on vulnerability. A forum that brings many of the current researchers on vulnerability together is the Expert Working Group (EWG). Researchers are currently working to refine definitions of “vulnerability”, measurement and assessment methods, and effective communication of research to decision makers.

Types

Social

Social vulnerability is one dimension of vulnerability that responds to multiple stressors (agent responsible for stress) and shocks, including abuse, social exclusion and natural hazards. Social vulnerability refers to the inability of people, organizations, and societies to withstand adverse impacts from multiple stressors to which they are exposed. These impacts are due in part to characteristics inherent in social interactions, institutions, and systems of cultural values. It was also found that marital status, employment, and income have an impact on the level of vulnerability presented in individuals. In this respect, there is a need to place an increased emphasis on assets and entitlements for understanding ‘catastrophe’ as opposed to solely the strength or severity of shocks. The capacity of individuals, communities and systems to survive, adapt, transform, and grow in the face of stress and shocks increase when conditions require it. Building resilience is about making people, communities, and systems better prepared to withstand catastrophic events—both natural and man-made—and able to bounce back more quickly and emerge stronger from these shocks and stresses.

Cognitive

A cognitive vulnerability, in cognitive psychology, is an erroneous belief, cognitive bias, or pattern of thought that is believed to predispose the individual to psychological problems.  Cognitive vulnerability is in place before the symptoms of psychological disorders start to appear, such as high neuroticism. After the individual encounters a stressful experience, the cognitive vulnerability shapes a maladaptive response that may lead to a psychological disorder. In psychopathology, cognitive vulnerability is constructed from schema models, hopelessness models, and attachment theory. The attachment theory states that humans need to develop a close bond with their caregivers. When there is a disruption in the child-parent bonding relationship it may be associated with cognitive vulnerability and depression. Attentional bias is a form of cognitive bias that can lead to cognitive vulnerability. Allocating a danger level to a threat depends on the urgency or intensity of the threshold.  Anxiety is not associated with selective orientation.

Environmental or climate change

Emotional 
Brene Brown defines vulnerability as "uncertainty, risk, and emotional exposure." Brown goes on to suggest that vulnerability is our most accurate measure of courage; we allow ourselves to be seen when we are vulnerable. Vulnerability is typically thought of as the center of emotions, such as grief, shame, fear, and disappointment, but it is also the center and birthplace of love, belonging, authenticity, creativity, courage, and accountability. Selective reinforcement and modeling has been used to help children learn from a young age how to regulate and take accountability for their emotions. Unpleasant emotional states are managed by their subjective discomfort. Emotional vulnerability is also impacted by respondents that express feelings of sadness about the uncertainty of climate change. Increasing awareness and impact leads to heightened emotional responses. Along with this, emotional vulnerability can affect the physical well-being of older adults when they suppress their emotions in highly distressing situations. When these vulnerabilities are supported through conversation with an emotionally safe "other," this vulnerability can lead to resilience and the capacity to support others.

Military

In military terminology, vulnerability is a subset of survivability, the others being susceptibility and recoverability. Vulnerability is defined in various ways depending on the nation and service arm concerned, but in general it refers to the near-instantaneous effects of a weapon attack. In aviation it is defined as the inability of an aircraft to withstand the damage caused by the man-made hostile environment. In some definitions, recoverability (damage control, firefighting, restoration of capability) is included in vulnerability. Some military services develop their own concept of vulnerability.

Political
Political vulnerability can be understood as “the weakness of the democratic system, with its negative effects on the efficiency of public policies, the legitimacy of the government action, limited participation of citizens and the private sector in national efforts, linkage with local governments and civil organizations, the handling and management of emergencies, processing of citizen’s demands and needs, and the capacity to meet them.” Democratic backsliding is a direct result of political vulnerability, and has been documented across the globe throughout history. Political vulnerability can also refer to elected officials’ or political candidates’ chances of election, with municipal and local elections often signifying a shift one way or the other on a national scale.

Invulnerability
Invulnerability is a common feature found in science fiction and fantasy, particularly in superhero fiction, as depicted in novels, comic books and video games. In such stories, it is a quality that makes a character impervious to pain, damage or loss of health.
There are many levels of invulnerability, just like there are many level of immortality (the highest level is absolute immortality). Many superheroes in comic books have invulnerability but it is often superhuman invulnerability (aka Strength-Based Invulnerability). It means that these superheroes develop a form of relative invulnerability, the user becoming impossible to harm by beings or forces less powerful than themselves. They are immune to most kinds of attacks but they can still be hurt or even killed by stronger characters.

In video games, it can be found in the form of "power-ups" or cheats; when activated via cheats, it is often referred to as "god mode". Generally, it does not protect the player from certain instant-death hazards, most notably "bottomless" pits from which, even if the player were to survive the fall, they would be unable to escape. As a rule, invulnerability granted by power-ups is temporary, and wears off after a set amount of time, while invulnerability cheats, once activated, remain in effect until deactivated, or the end of the level is reached. "Depending on the game in question, invulnerability to damage may or may not protect the player from non-damage effects, such as being immobilized or sent flying."

In mythology, talismans, charms, and amulets were created by magic users for the purpose of making the wearer immune to injury from both mystic and mundane weapons.

See also

 Courage
 Gullibility
 Emotional insecurity
 Exploitation of labour
 Representativeness heuristic
 True self and false self
 Vulnerabilities exploited by manipulators
 Vulnerability and care theory of love
 Vulnerability in computing
 Vulnerability index
 Vulnerable adult

References

External links

 Community based vulnerability mapping in Búzi, Mozambique (GIS and Remote Sensing)
 MunichRe Foundation
 Satellite Vulnerability
Survivability/Lethality Analysis – US Army
RESIST RESIST Vulnerability Assessment Code
 Top Computer Vulnerabilities
 United Nations University Institute of Environment and Human Security
VULNERABILITY LABORATORY  (Verified Vulnerability Research Project)
Vulners vulnerability database with API

 
Risk
Military science

ko:보안 취약점